Lower Cumberworth is a village in the borough of Kirklees, West Yorkshire, England. The village is situated 8 miles (13 km) to the south-east of Huddersfield. 

The civil parish of Denby Dale covers the village. The parish council gave the population of the villages of Upper and Lower Cumberworth as 1,222 in the 2001 Census.

The village
The village consists of around 200 homes. It has a cricket ground that is home to Cumberworth United Cricket Club They play in the Huddersfield Cricket League.

The village also has a public house called "The Foresters Arms" and there is also the Lower Cumberworth Methodist Church.

The Cumberworth Community Association is open to all residents and aims to improve the facilities of the local area by raising money via local events.

See also
Listed buildings in Denby Dale

References

External links

 ddcwcircuit.org.uk

Villages in West Yorkshire
Denby Dale